Long Lived In-situ Solar System Explorer (LLISSE) is a possible NASA payload on the Russian Venera-D mission to Venus. LLISSE uses new materials and heat-resistant electronics that would enable independent operation for about 90 Earth days. This endurance may allow it to obtain periodic measurements of weather data to update global circulation models and quantify near surface atmospheric chemistry variability. Its anticipated instruments include wind speed/direction sensors, temperature sensors, pressure sensors, and a chemical multi-sensor array. The Venera-D lander may carry two LLISSE units; one would be battery-powered (3,000 h), and the other would be wind-powered.

References

Venera program
NASA
Spacecraft instruments
Meteorological instrumentation and equipment
Space science experiments